Neuhaus-Schierschnitz is a former municipality in the Sonneberg district of Thuringia, Germany. It was merged into the new municipality Föritztal together with Föritz and Judenbach on 6 July 2018.

References

External links
 Neuhaus-Schierschnitz on the Föritztal website (German)

Former municipalities in Thuringia
Sonneberg (district)
Duchy of Saxe-Meiningen